Texenna is a district in Jijel Province, Algeria. It was named after its capital, Texenna.

Municipalities
The district is further divided into 2 municipalities:
Texenna
Kaous